Giovanni di Giovanni (c. 1350 – 7 May 1365?) was one of the youngest victims of the  campaign against sodomy waged in 14th-century Florence. 
The prosecution came on the heels of the Black Death, the bubonic plague epidemic which had ravaged the city two years earlier. Some of the most influential people of the religious establishment blamed sodomites for having brought the wrath of God down on the heads of the populace. The "remedy" they promoted was to purify the city of evil by means of fire, leading to burnings at the stake and other punishments (red-hot iron) such as that suffered by Giovanni di Giovanni.

Di Giovanni was labeled "a public and notorious passive sodomite"  and convicted by the Podestà court of being the passive partner of a number of different men. His punishment was to be paraded on the back of an ass, then to be publicly castrated. Finally, he was to have his anus burned with a red-hot iron (or, as the sentence read: "[punished] in that part of the body where he allowed himself to be known in sodomitical practice"), it is presumed he did not survive the ordeal.

See also
History of Christianity and homosexuality
History of human sexuality
List of people executed for homosexuality
Violence against LGBT people

References

1350s births
1365 deaths
14th-century executions
Executed Italian people
Italian gay men
Medieval LGBT people
People executed for sodomy
People executed by Florence
People executed by torture
People from the Province of Florence
People prosecuted under anti-homosexuality laws
Italian children
Executed children